Jack Kevin Haley (January 27, 1964 – March 16, 2015) was an American professional basketball player.

Early life and education 
Haley was the son of noted surfing pioneer Jack Haley, Sr. A 6'10" forward/center from Huntington Beach High School and  UCLA, Haley spent nine seasons (1988–1992; 1993–1998) in the National Basketball Association as a member of the Chicago Bulls, New Jersey Nets, Los Angeles Lakers, and San Antonio Spurs.

Chicago Bulls tenure 

Haley was drafted in 1987 by the Chicago Bulls and made his NBA debut on November 9, 1988.

After several years playing elsewhere, Haley returned to the Bulls as a free agent in October 1995 and was a member of the 1995–96 Bulls team that won a league record 72 games and the NBA Championship. However, Haley spent almost the entire season on the injured list with tendinitis in his left knee. As a result, he only played in one game during the regular season and did not participate in the playoffs.  At one point, another unidentified team complained to the league office, which sent out a doctor to examine Haley's knee.  At the same time, Haley developed a reputation for his enthusiastic cheering of his teammates on the Bulls' bench all season long, compared to what one newspaper described as a more somber Bulls' bench.

On Sunday, April 21, 1996, Haley played in the Bulls' final regular-season game, drawing what the Chicago Tribune called "polite—albeit sarcastic—reception from the crowd."  Haley ended up with five points.  "It felt good to finally get in a game," he told the paper.  "I was real excited and my adrenaline was pumping.  I haven't played in a year.  I missed some easy shots.  I guess I was aggressive.  I took almost a shot per minute played."

Haley was mainly known for his friendship with Dennis Rodman, and was sometimes referred to as Rodman's "babysitter". However, Haley bristled at the label, and argued that he had legitimately earned his spot on the team.

Post-playing career 

Following his playing career, Haley served as an assistant coach for the New Jersey Nets and as a television broadcaster for the Lakers, co-hosting the Lakers Live pre-game show with Bill Macdonald for Fox Sports Net West/Prime Ticket. Haley also acted, appearing in the films Eddie and Rebound, as well as the music video for Aerosmith's "Love in an Elevator."

Death 
Haley died on March 16, 2015, of heart disease at age 51. On April 16, 2015, a memorial service at the Walter Pyramid in Long Beach was attended by family and friends, including notable NBA players and coaches.

References

External links
Career statistics at Basketball Reference

1964 births
2015 deaths
AEK B.C. players
American expatriate basketball people in Greece
American expatriate basketball people in Spain
American men's basketball players
Basketball coaches from California
Basketball players from Long Beach, California
Centers (basketball)
Chicago Bulls draft picks
Chicago Bulls players
Greek Basket League players
Junior college men's basketball players in the United States
La Crosse Bobcats players
Liga ACB players
Los Angeles Lakers players
National Basketball Association broadcasters
New Jersey Nets assistant coaches
New Jersey Nets players
Power forwards (basketball)
RCD Espanyol Bàsquet players
San Antonio Spurs players
Sportspeople from Long Beach, California
UCLA Bruins men's basketball players